Troy Lynd Endicott (born April 15, 1971) is a United States Space Force brigadier general serving as the Assistant Deputy Chief of Space Operations for Operations, Cyber and Nuclear. Previously, he was the director for space policy at the United States National Security Council. Prior to that, he was the commander of the 460th Space Wing.

Education 

 1994 Bachelor of Science, Aerospace Engineering, Embry-Riddle Aeronautical University, Prescott, Arizona
 1999 Master of Science, space operations, Air Force Institute of Technology, Wright-Patterson Air Force Base, Ohio
 1999 Squadron Officer School, Maxwell AFB, Alabama
 2002 U.S. Air Force Weapons School, Nellis AFB, Nevada
 2004 Air Command and Staff College, Maxwell AFB, Ala., by correspondence
 2006 Army Command and General Staff College, Fort Leavenworth, Kansas
 2008 Air War College, Maxwell AFB, Ala., by correspondence
 2013 National Defense Fellowship (Senior Developmental Education), Harvard University Belfer Center for Science & International Affairs, Cambridge, Massachusetts
 2014 Joint Forces Staff College (Joint Professional Military Education, Phase II), Norfolk, Virginia
 2016 Leadership Development Program, Center for Creative Leadership, Colorado Springs, Colorado

Assignments 

 September 1994–April 1995, Flight Test Project Officer, Tri-Service Standoff Attack Missile Program Office, Aeronautical Systems Center, Wright-Patterson Air Force Base, Ohio
 April 1995–August 1997, Reconnaissance Systems Project Manager, Aeronautical Systems Center, Wright-Patterson AFB, Ohio
 August 1997–March 1999, student, Air Force Institute of Technology, Wright-Patterson AFB, Ohio
 March 1999–January 2002, Orbital Analyst Instructor (Air Education and Training Command Master Instructor) and flight commander, Detachment 1, 533rd Training Squadron, Schriever AFB, Colorado
 January 2002–June 2002, student, U.S. Air Force Weapons School, Nellis AFB, Nevada
 June 2002–March 2005, chief, Space Operations Plans, Headquarters 16th Air Force, Aviano Air Base, Italy
 April 2005–June 2006, student, U.S. Army Command & General Staff College, Fort Leavenworth, Kansas
 June 2006–April 2008, chief, Current Operations, Headquarters Air Force Space Command Space Operations Squadron, and member, Commander's Action Group, Headquarters Air Force Space Command, Peterson AFB, Colorado
 May 2008–May 2009, operations officer, 76th Space Control Squadron, Peterson AFB, Colorado
 May 2009–May 2011, commander, 21st Operations Support Squadron, Peterson AFB, Colorado
 June 2011–June 2012, executive officer to the commander, 14th Air Force and Joint Functional Component Command for Space, Vandenberg AFB, California
 July 2012–June 2013, senior developmental education student, National Defense Fellow, Belfer Center for Science & International Affairs, John F. Kennedy School of Government, Harvard University, Cambridge, Massachusetts
 July 2013–June 2015, chief, Policy and Integration Division, Department of Defense Executive Agent for Space Staff, Office of the Secretary of the Air Force, the Pentagon, Arlington, Virginia
 June 2015–May 2017, commander, 21st Operations Group, Peterson AFB, Colorado
 June 2017–January 2018, executive officer to the commander, Air Force Space Command, Peterson AFB, Colorado
 January 2018–May 2019, commander, 460th Space Wing, Buckley AFB, Colorado
 May 2019–May 2021, director for space policy, National Security Council, the White House, Washington, D.C.
 May 2021–present, assistant deputy chief of space operations for operations, cyber and nuclear, United States Space Force, the Pentagon, Arlington, Virginia

Awards and decorations

Endicott is the recipient of the following awards:

Dates of promotion

Writings

References 

Living people
Place of birth missing (living people)
United States Air Force generals
United States Space Force generals
1971 births